Tino Corp. is a record label that is "dedicated to curating unique beats and sounds", including funky breaks and scratching records.  It is made up of the following people:

 Tino, a Cuban resident, is the "CEO and principal artist"; there is debate as to whether he is a real person or a fictional character.
 Ben Stokes, of Dimensional Holofonic Sound
 Jack Dangers, of Meat Beat Manifesto
 Mike Powell, of Bo Square

Releases have included several dub music albums under this name, including a Halloween one and a Christmas music sampler EP.

See also 
 List of record labels

External links
 Official site (from the internet archive)

American record labels
Electronic music record labels